Arshdeep Bains (born January 9, 2001) is a Canadian professional ice hockey left winger playing for the Abbotsford Canucks in the American Hockey League (AHL) as a prospect to the Vancouver Canucks of the National Hockey League (NHL).

Playing career 
Bains began playing league hockey in 2015, where he played in CSSHL for Delta Hockey Academy in the U15 class. He then played two seasons in the U18 class of CSSHL, intermittently also playing in the WHL for the Red Deer Rebels. He played for the Rebels in the following 4 WHL seasons.

Bains was the WHL Scoring Champion for the 2021-22 season, finishing the season with 43 goals and 69 assists, becoming the first player of South Asian descent to win the Bob Clarke Trophy.

On March 11, 2022, Bains signed an entry-level contract with the Vancouver Canucks.

Career statistics

References

External links

2001 births
Living people
Abbotsford Canucks players
Canadian ice hockey left wingers
Ice hockey people from British Columbia
Sportspeople from Surrey, British Columbia
Canadian people of Punjabi descent
Canadian sportspeople of Indian descent
Red Deer Rebels players